Mark Wilson Perry is an American politician and a Democratic former member of the Arkansas House of Representatives representing District 42 since from January 14, 2013, to January 12, 2015. Perry served consecutively from January 2009 until January 2013 in the District 44 seat.

Education
Perry earned his bachelor's degree in marketing from the University of Central Arkansas.

Elections
2012 Redistricted to District 42, with Representative Jane English running for Arkansas Senate, Perry was unopposed for both the May 22, 2012 Democratic Primary and the November 6, 2012 General election.
2008 Initially in District 44, when Will Bond left the Legislature and left the seat open, Perry was unopposed for both the May 20, 2008 Democratic Primary and the November 4, 2008 General election.
2010 Perry was unopposed for both the May 18, 2010 Democratic Primary and the November 2, 2010 General election.

References

External links
Official page at the Arkansas House of Representatives

Mark Perry at Ballotpedia
Mark Perry at OpenSecrets

Place of birth missing (living people)
Year of birth missing (living people)
Living people
Democratic Party members of the Arkansas House of Representatives
People from Jacksonville, Arkansas
University of Central Arkansas alumni